J.P. Javali (4 May 1931 - 21 November 2001) was an Indian politician and Member of Rajya Sabha (the upper house of the Parliament of India) from 1988 to 1994.

Early life and background 
Javali was born on 4th May 1931 in Tumkur. Padmanabhaiah was his father. He completed his education from Karnataka College Dharwad, Karnataka.

Personal life 
Javali married Shakuntla J. Javali in 1954 and the couple has 3 sons and 1 daughter.

Position held

Death 
J.P. Javali died on 21 November 2001 at the age of 70.

References 

1931 births
2001 deaths
Indian politicians
Janata Dal politicians

Rajya Sabha members from Karnataka
Dharwad district
Karnataka politicians